The 2009–10 Liga IV was the fourth level of the Romanian football league system. The champions of each county association play against one from a neighboring county in a playoff on a neutral venue to gain promotion. The number of teams differ from one county association to another.

Promotion play-off

The matches was scheduled to be played on 15 June 2010.

|-

|}

County leagues

Alba County

Arad County

Argeș County

Bacău County

Bihor County

Bistrița-Năsăud County

Botoșani County  

Relegation play-off 
The 12th and 13th-placed teams of the Liga IV faces the 2nd placed teams from the two series of Liga V Botoșani.

Brașov County

Brăila County

Bucharest  
Final 

Spic de Grâu București won the 2009–10 Liga IV București and qualify to promotion play-off in Liga III.

Buzău County  
Series I

Series II=

Championship play-off 
The championship play-off played between the best two ranked teams in each series of the regular season.
Semi-finals

Final
The championship final was played on 9 June 2010 at Petrolul Stadium in Berca.

Recolta Cislău won the 2009–10 Liga IV Buzău County. ABC Stoicescu qualify to promotion play-off in Liga III because was the only team from play-off that have C.I.S. (Sports Identity Certificate) issued by the Ministry of Youth and Sports required to play in Liga III.

Caraș-Severin County

Călărași County  
East Series

West Series

Championship play-off 
The championship play-off was played between the first two ranked teams in each series of the regular season.
Semi-finals

Final
The championship final was played on 5 June 2010 at Ion Comșa Stadium in Călărași.

Phoenix Ulmu won the 2009–10 Liga IV Călărași County and qualify to promotion play-off in Liga III.

Cluj County

Constanța County  
East Series

West Series

Championship play-off 
The teams started the play-off with all the records achieved in the regular season against the other qualified teams from series and played only against the teams from the other series.

Championship play-out 
The teams started the play-out with all the records achieved in the regular season against the other qualified teams from series and played only against the teams from the other series.

Covasna County

Dâmbovița County

Dolj County

Galați County

Giurgiu County  

Championship play-off 
The championship play-off played between the best four ranked team in the regular season. All matches were played at Dunărea-Port Stadium on 2 June (semi-finals) and 5 June 2010 (final).
Semi-finals

Final

Nova Force Giurgiu won the 2009–10 Liga IV Giurgiu County and qualify to promotion play-off in Liga III.

Gorj County

Harghita County

Hunedoara County

Ialomița County

Iași County

Ilfov County  

Championship play-off 
Championship play-off played in a single round-robin tournament between the best four teams of the regular season. The teams started the play-off with the following points: 1st place – 3 points, 2nd place – 2 points, 3rd place – 1 point, 4th place – 0 points.

Maramureș County  
North Series

 South Series

Championship final 
The championship final was played on 2 June 2010 at Viorel Mateianu Stadium in Baia Mare.

Spicul Mocira won the 2009–10 Liga IV Maramureș County and qualify to promotion play-off in Liga III.

Mehedinți County

Mureș County

Neamț County

Olt County

Prahova County

Satu Mare County  
Seria A 

Seria B

Championship final 
The championship final was played on 5 June 2010 at Olimpia Stadium in Satu Mare.

Victoria Carei won the 2009–10 Liga IV Satu Mare County and qualify to promotion play-off in Liga III.

Sălaj County  
East Series

West Series

Championship play-off

Championship play-out

Sibiu County

Suceava County

Teleorman County

Timiș County

Tulcea County

Vaslui County  
Championship play-off 
The championship play-off was contested between the top two teams in the two series of the regular season.
Semi-finals

Final

Dinamo ARI Râșești won the 2009–10 Liga IV Vaslui County and qualify to promotion play-off in Liga III.

Vâlcea County

Vrancea County  
Seria Nord 

Seria Sud

Championship play-off 
Quarter-finals

Semi-finals

Final

Adjud won the 2009–10 Liga IV Vrancea County and qualify to promotion play-off in Liga III.

See also 
 2009–10 Liga I
 2009–10 Liga II
 2009–10 Liga III

References

External links
 Official website 

Liga IV seasons
4
Romania